The Malaysian Matriculation Programme (Malay: Program Matrikulasi Malaysia) is a one year pre-university preparatory programme offered by the Ministry of Education, Malaysia. 

Starting 2005, the selection process for the programme is done through a race-based quota system, where 90% of the places are reserved for bumiputeras students while the remaining 10% are open for non-bumiputeras. This has sparked multiple controversies and backlashes that upsets the non-Bumiputera community such as not being privileged to continue studying in the programme despite having excellent results.

Every leavers from the matriculation programme will receive a certificate which is "Sijil Matrikulasi KPM" which is certified and recognised by every public universities in Malaysia and overseas such as United Kingdom, Australia and New Zealand unlike, the STPM or the Malaysian Higher School Certificate which it is globally-recognised.

Eligibility

To be eligible for the programme. One has to fulfill the requirements stated based on the grades achieved in the SPM result obtained in the previous year. 
For instance:,

Jurusan Sains (Science Stream) :

Bahasa Melayu - C
Bahasa Inggeris - C
Mathematics - B
Additional Mathematics - C
Chemistry - C
Physics or Biology - C
Sejarah - Pass

Jurusan Kejuruteraan 
(Engineering Stream):

Bahasa Melayu - C
Bahasa Inggeris - C
Mathematics - B
Additional Mathematics - C
Physics - C
Chemistry - Pass
Sejarah - Pass
and C in (1) of these subjects:, 
Biology/ Additional Science/ Lukisan Kejuruteraan/ Pengajian Kejuruteraan 
Awam/ Pengajian Kejuruteraan Mekanikal/ Pengajian Kejuruteraan 
Elektrik & Elektronik/ Asas Kelestarian/ Pertanian/ Sains Rumah Tangga/ 
Reka Cipta / Sains Komputer/ Sains Sukan/ Lukisan Kejuruteraan/ Grafik 
Komunikasi Teknikal/ Prinsip Perakaunan / Ekonomi/ Perdagangan/ 
Perniagaan

Jurusan Perakaunan 
(Accounting Stream):

Bahasa Melayu - C
Bahasa Inggeris - C
Mathematics - C
Sejarah - Pass
and C in (3) of these subjects:, 
Physics / Chemistry / Biology/ Additional Mathematics / Science/ Additional Science/ 
Lukisan Kejuruteraan/ Asas Kelestarian/ Pertanian/ Sains Rumah 
Tangga/ Reka Cipta / Sains Komputer/ Sains Sukan/ Lukisan 
Kejuruteraan/ Grafik Komunikasi Teknikal/ Prinsip Perakaunan/ Ekonomi/ 
Perdagangan/ Perniagaan/ Pendidikan Syariah Islamiah/ Tasawwur 
Islam/ Pengajian Kejuruteraan Awam/ Pengajian Kejuruteraan Mekanikal/ 
Pengajian Kejuruteraan Elektrik & Elektronik

Jurusan Perakaunan Profesional 
(Professional Accounting Stream)
[Bumiputera only]:

Bahasa Melayu - C
Bahasa Inggeris - A-
Mathematics - A
Additional Matematics - C
Sejarah - Pass
and A in (3) of these subjects:, 
Physics/ Chemistry/ Biology/ Science/ Additional Science/ 
Lukisan Kejuruteraan/ Asas Kelestarian/ Pertanian/ Sains Rumah 
Tangga/ Reka Cipta / Sains Komputer/ Sains Sukan/ Lukisan 
Kejuruteraan/ Grafik Komunikasi Teknikal/ Prinsip Perakaunan/ Ekonomi/ 
Perdagangan/ Perniagaan/ Pendidikan Syariah Islamiah/ Tasawwur 
Islam/ Pengajian Kejuruteraan Awam/ Pengajian Kejuruteraan Mekanikal/ 
Pengajian Kejuruteraan Elektrik & Elektronik

Pass Apititude Test and Interview

Background
Since its inception in the 1980s, the matriculation programme was handled by respective local universities. In 1998, the Matriculation Division was established by the Ministry of Education, Malaysia. The first matriculation programme started in 1999. The selection of potential candidates entering the programme are based on the result of the trial examination for Sijil Pelajaran Malaysia (SPM). 

Prior to 2019, seats for matriculation programme has been increased from 25,000 to 40,000 but the 90:10 quota retained, sparking controversy especially among non-Malay political parties and community for marginalizing Sijil Tinggi Persekolahan Malaysia (STPM) candidates.

Programmes offered
Prior to 2006, only one-year programmes are being conducted. Since then, four different programmes are offered. They are One Year Programme (PST, short for Program Satu Tahun in Malay), Two Year Programme (PDT, short for Program Dua Tahun in Malay), Technical Programme and Accounting Programme. Mathematics, Physics, Biology, Chemistry and Informatics Science subjects are conducted in English. Other compulsory subjects are English, Dynamics Skills (Kemahiran Dinamika), Islamic/Moral Study and Information Technology.  Students are also required to take up a co-curricular activity of their choice (sports/games, societies/clubs or marching band) during the programme.

One Year Programme (PST)
PST is a one-year, two-semester programme. Students from science, technical and accounting background can register for this programme. Particularly, for students from science background, there are three different modules to choose from. The subjects offered in the three modules are:
 Module I: Mathematics, Chemistry, Physics and Biology.(sem 1:dinamika)
 Module II: Mathematics, Chemistry, Physics and Computer Science.(sem 1:kokurikulum)
 Module III: Mathematics, Chemistry, Biology and Computer Science.(sem 1:dinamika).

Two Year Programme (PDT)
PDT is a two-year, four-semester programme.This programme is offered and open only for Bumiputera. If the pupil fail to fulfill the requirements stated for the one year programme. They have a chance to apply for this. The eligibility is stated as below :-

Jurusan Sains (Science Stream) :

Bahasa Melayu - C
Bahasa Inggeris - C
Mathematics - Pass
Additional Mathematics - Pass
Chemistry - Pass
Physics or Biology - Pass
Sejarah - Pass

Accounting Programme
This is a one-year, two-semester programme. The four subjects taught in the accounting module are Mathematics, Accounting, Business Study and Economy.

Technical Programme
First introduced in academic session 2009/2010, this one-year, four-semester programme is only available for students from technical secondary schools, or students from secondary schools with knowledge and background in engineering technology. Students registered for the technical modules will study four subjects - Mathematics, Chemical Engineering, Physical Engineering and Engineering Study.

Colleges
They are a total of 17 learning institutions in Malaysia that offer the Matriculation Programme. They include 12 matriculation colleges located in various states of Malaysia, two MARA colleges, and three engineering matriculation colleges, that are managed by the Ministry of Education, Malaysia.

Matriculation Colleges
 Sarawak Matriculation College in Demak Laut, Sarawak. (Kolej Matrikulasi Sarawak) 
 Malacca Matriculation College in Alor Gajah, Melaka. (Kolej Matrikulasi Melaka) 
 Negeri Sembilan Matriculation College in Kuala Pilah, Negeri Sembilan. (Kolej Matrikulasi Negeri Sembilan) 
 Penang Matriculation College in Kepala Batas, Penang. (Kolej Matrikulasi Pulau Pinang)
 Perlis Matriculation College in Arau, Perlis. (Kolej Matrikulasi Perlis) 
 Labuan Matriculation College in Merinding, Labuan. (Kolej Matrikulasi Labuan) 
Kelantan Matriculation College in Selising, Kelantan. (Kolej Matrikulasi Kelantan) 
Johor Matriculation College in Tangkak, Johor. (Kolej Matrikulasi Johor) 
Perak Matriculation College in Gopeng, Perak. (Kolej Matrikulasi Perak) 
Kedah Matriculation College in Changlun, Kedah. (Kolej Matrikulasi Kedah) 
Selangor Matriculation College in Banting, Selangor. (Kolej Matrikulasi Selangor) 
Pahang Matriculation College in Gambang, Pahang. (Kolej Matrikulasi Pahang)

MARA Colleges
 Kuala Nerang MARA College in Kuala Nerang, Padang Terap, Kedah. (Kolej MARA Kuala Nerang) 
 Kulim MARA College in Kulim, Kedah. (Kolej MARA Kulim)

Engineering Matriculation Colleges
 Kedah Engineering Matriculation College in Pendang, Kedah. (Kolej Matrikulasi Kejuruteraan Kedah) 
 Pahang Engineering Matriculation College in Bandar Tun Abdul Razak, Jengka, Pahang. (Kolej Matrikulasi Kejuruteraan Pahang) 
 Johor Engineering Matriculation College in Pontian, Johor. (Kolej Matrikulasi Kejuruteraan Johor)

References

Education policy in Malaysia
Colleges in Malaysia
Racial and religious quotas in Malaysia